Ariamnes birgitae is a species of comb-footed spider in the family Theridiidae. It is found in Myanmar.

References

Theridiidae
Spiders described in 1917
Spiders of Asia